Chengdu Academy of Governance is a station on Line 2 of the Chengdu Metro in China. It previously served as the eastern terminus for Line 2 until 2014.

Station layout

References

Railway stations in Sichuan
Railway stations in China opened in 2012
Chengdu Metro stations